Spilosoma daitoensis is a moth in the family Erebidae. It was described by Shōnen Matsumura in 1930. It is found in Taiwan.

References

Moths described in 1930
daitoensis